Mohammad Mehdi Goorangi ( born 23 June 1975 in Shiraz, Iran) is an Iranian musician and composer.

Life and career
Goorangi started playing piano and the dulcimer (the Santour) at a young age. He gained his first musical experiences by composing songs for the Educational-affairs Association of Education Organization when he was in high school. He had the honor of being instructed by some of the greatest musicians such as: Mohammad Tagahi Massoudieh, Alireza Mashayekhi, Shahin Farhat, Sharif Lotfi, Majid Kiani, Mohammad Ali Haddadian, Mohammad Esmaili, Masood Shenasa,  Amir-Ashraf Arianpoor and Mohammad-Reza Darvishi while studying at the university.

In 1995 he started working for the IRIB (The Islamic Republic of Iran Broadcasting), composing and arranging melodies, songs and orchestral pieces. In 1996 he became a member of the Young Composers Association of the IRIB Organization, managed by Hassan Riahi. He started his professional career in film music by composing music for short films while he was a university student. Since then he has composed and arranged music for over 100 films, TV series, songs, melodies, orchestral pieces, animations, documentaries and plays of different scales and genres. At the moment, his major activities are lecturing at the university and composing sound tracks for movies and TV series. The album, A Truth Like an Imagination, released in 2015, is a selection of his six film and series scores. In 2018, he attained a PhD in Musicology from Georgia. In February 2017, at the unveiling conference of the national project "Book Partner - With the Pen", Mohammad Mehdi Goorangi was honored as the top partner in the field of books and reading.

Professional experiences and qualifications 
Among the artistic and research activities of Mohammad Mehdi Goorangi, the following can be mentioned:

A member of Composers Association in "Iran's House of Cinema Organization" (khaneye cinema), A member of Researchers and Composers Association in "House of Music Organization" (khaneye mooseghi), A member of Education and Research Committee of IRIB in 2010, Organizing a band and performing a concert based on the film called "Passenger from India" (Mosaferi Az Hend) in 2003, Writing a book, The Creativity of Music (Khalaghiate Moosighi), in 2003, Instructing the basics of classical music and film music, at the university since 2005, Establishing the Music Department of Mehr-e-Taban Academy, International School in Shiraz in 2013, Head of Music Department at Soroush University since 2017, Membership in the jury for the selection of films of the 18th Iranian Cinema House Festival, Executive Director of "Salnava of Iranian Music"

Albums 

 Traveler from India 
 I Can Read Too
 Loser
 A Truth Like an Imagination
 At the Sunrise

References

External links
 Goorangi's Official Webpage
 facebook

Iranian composers
Iranian film score composers
Iranian pianists
Iranian songwriters
Living people
1975 births
21st-century pianists